Theatre of Greece may refer to:

 Theatre of ancient Greece
 Modern Greek theatre
 National Theatre of Greece, Athens, founded in 1880